Sit commonly refers to sitting.

Sit, SIT or Sitting may also refer to:

Places 
 Sit (island), Croatia
 Sit, Bashagard, a village in Hormozgan Province, Iran
 Sit, Gafr and Parmon, a village in Hormozgan Province, Iran
 Sit, Minab, a village in Hormozgan Province
 Sit-e Bandkharas, a village in Hormozgan Province, Iran
 Sit (river), a river in Russia
 Sit-e Bandkharas, a village in Hormozgan Province, Iran

Organizations 
 Singapore Improvement Trust, a government public housing organization
 Special Investigation Team (India), a team of Indian investigators for serious crimes.
 Special Investigation Team, a specialized team of officers in Japanese law enforcement consisting of officers trained to investigate serious crimes with SWAT elements attached.
 Strategic Information Technology, a Canadian banking software company

Educational organizations and certification
 Salazar Institute of Technology, Cebu, Philippines
 Schaffhausen Institute of Technology, Schaffhausen, Switzerland
 School of Information Technology, King Mongkut's University of Technology Thonburi, Bangkok, Thailand
 School of Information Technology, Kolkata, India
 School for International Training, Brattleboro, Vermont
 Shibaura Institute of Technology, Tokyo, Japan
 Siddaganga Institute of Technology, Tumkur, Karnataka, India
 Siliguri Institute of Technology, West Bengal, India
 Singapore Institute of Technology, an autonomous university in Singapore
 Southeastern Institute of Technology, Huntsville, Alabama, United States
 Southern Institute of Technology, Invercargill, New Zealand
 Stevens Institute of Technology, Hoboken, New Jersey, United States

Psychology 
 Sexual Identity Therapy
 SIT-lite, pejorative term for a form of social identity theory
 Structural Information Theory, a theory of human perception

Science and technology 

 Sea ice thickness
 SIT or SITh, static induction thyristor
 SIT, static induction transistor
 SIT, Simple Internet Transition, an IPv6 over IPv4 tunneling protocol
 .sit, or .sitx, file extensions used for compressed files created with StuffIt
 System integration testing, a process in software engineering
 Special information tones (telephony), a three beep signal indicating a call did not go through
 Specific ion Interaction Theory, a theory for estimation of single-ion activity coefficients
 Sprint interval training, a form of high-intensity interval training in which sprinting is interspersed with walking
 Sterile insect technique, a technique for managing insect populations
 Systematic Inventive Thinking, a practical methodology for innovation and creative problem solving
 Systematic Inventive Thinking (company), a company based in Israel implementing the Systematic Inventive Thinking method in organizations

Transport
 SIT, IATA code for Sitka Rocky Gutierrez Airport
 SIT, National Rail station code for Sittingbourne railway station, Kent, England

Other 
 Sino-Tibetan languages, the ISO 639-2 code
 Slovenian tolar, the ISO 4217 code for the former currency of Slovenia
 SİT areas in Turkey, archaeological sites in Turkey
 Sit (surname), Chinese surname
 "Sitting", a song from Cat Stevens' album Catch Bull at Four